Atlantic Coast Airlines (ACA) was an airline based in the United States owned by Atlantic Coast Holdings, Inc. It operated as United Express for United Airlines and Delta Connection for Delta Air Lines. It was headquartered in the Dulles area of unincorporated Loudoun County, Virginia, United States. Previously it was headquartered in Reston, unincorporated Fairfax County. Before then, it was headquartered in Sterling, unincorporated Loudoun County.

History
The airline was established and started operations on December 15, 1989, and had been in a marketing agreement with United Airlines since its inception. In 1999 it established Atlantic Coast Jet to operate as a Delta Connection carrier, but this was later reintegrated.

Atlantic Coast Airlines operated United Express flights out of Dulles and O'Hare International Airport in Chicago with Jetstream 32, Jetstream 41, DeHavilland DHC-8, Embraer 120 Brasilia and Canadair regional jet aircraft. Their Delta Connection flights out of Logan International Airport in Boston, New York City's LaGuardia Airport, and Cincinnati/Northern Kentucky International Airport in Covington, Kentucky were operated with the Fairchild Dornier 328. During 2003 revenues were generated about 80% from United Express operations and 20% from Delta Connection.

United Airlines entered bankruptcy protection in December 2002.  At that time United Airlines contracted a consulting firm, Bain, to renegotiate its regional partners contracts.  Atlantic Coast Airlines employees and management went through a significant cost reduction program to remain competitive as a United Express carrier.  Presented with overwhelming competition from other regional airlines Atlantic Coast Airlines and United Airlines were unable to negotiate a mutual agreement. At that time Atlantic Coast Airlines continued to honor its 10-year contract with United Airlines. Expecting that United would be unable to honor that contract, Atlantic Coast Airlines developed an alternate business plan.

After announcing plans to part with United Airlines, Atlantic Coast Airlines' significant cash position made it a prime target for a takeover attempt. Mesa Air Group launched an attempt at a hostile takeover in the summer of 2003, engaging in what some allege were significant U.S. Securities and Exchange Commission violations. At the same time the employees of Atlantic Coast Airlines organized a grass roots effort to avert the takeover attempt. Within a few months the stock purchase plan was removed by Mesa.

On November 19, 2003, Atlantic Coast Airlines announced that it would become a low-cost carrier under the name of Independence Air. Its status as a United Express carrier ended on August 4, 2004, and its status as a Delta Connection carrier ended November 2, 2004. Operations as Independence Air began on June 16, 2004. On January 5, 2006, Independence Air ceased operations.

On March 10, 2006, Northwest Airlines purchased the DOT Operating Certificate of then-Independence Air with the intent to use that certificate to form a new regional subsidiary. The result was Compass Airlines, which began service using Embraer E175 jets in August 2007.

See also 
 List of defunct airlines of the United States
United Express Flight 6291, a flight operated by ACA for United that crashed.

References

External links
Atlantic Coast Airlines (Archive)
Eric Gillin, Eric. "Atlantic Coast Pushes Ahead With Plans to Become Low-Cost Carrier ," TheStreet.com, November 19, 2003

Defunct airlines of the United States
Airlines established in 1989
Airlines disestablished in 2006
Companies based in Reston, Virginia
Companies based in Dulles, Virginia
American companies established in 1989
1989 establishments in Virginia
2006 disestablishments in Virginia